Class N:Fine Arts is a classification used by the Library of Congress Classification system. This page outlines the subclasses of Class N.

N - Visual Arts 

1-58..........................................General
61-72........................................Theory. Philosophy. Aesthetics of the visual arts
81-390......................................Study and teaching. Research
400-3990..................................Art museums, galleries, etc.
4390-5098................................Exhibitions
5198-5299................................Private collections and collectors
5300-7418................................History
7420-7525.8..............................General works
7560-8266................................Special subjects of art
8350-8356................................Art as a profession. Artists
8510-8553................................Art studios, materials, etc.
8554-8585................................Examination and conservation of works of art
8600-8675................................Economics of art
8700-9165................................Art and the state. Public art

NA - Architecture 

1-60........................................General
100-130..................................Architecture and the state
190-1555.5..............................History
1995........................................Architecture as a profession
2000-2320..............................Study and teaching. Research
2335-2360..............................Competitions
2400-2460..............................Museums. Exhibitions
2500-2599..............................General works
2599.5-2599.9........................Architectural criticism
2695-2793..............................Architectural drawing and design
2835-4050..............................Details and decoration
4100-8480..............................Special classes of buildings
4100-4145....................................Classed by material
4150-4160....................................Classed by form
4170-8480....................................Classed by use
4170-(7020)........................................Public buildings
4590-5621................................................Religious architecture
7100-7884..........................................Domestic architecture. Houses. Dwellings
7910-8125..........................................Clubhouses, guild houses, etc.
8200-8260..........................................Farm architecture
8300-8480..........................................Outbuildings, gates, fences, etc.
9000-9428..............................Aesthetics of cities. City planning and beautifying

NB - Sculpture 

1-50........................................General
60-1115..................................History. Including collective biography
1120-1133..............................Study and teaching
1134-1134.4............................Competitions
1135-1150..............................General works
1160-1195..............................Designs and technique
1199-1200..............................Restoration of sculptures
1203-1270..............................Special materials
1272-1291..............................Mobiles, color, sculpture gardens, etc.
1293-1895..............................Special forms
1293-1310....................................Portrait sculpture
1312-1313....................................Equestrian statues
1330-1685....................................Sculptural monuments
1750-1793....................................Religious monuments and shrines
1800-1880....................................Sepulchral monuments
1910-1952..............................Special subjects

NC - Drawing. Design. Illustration 

1-45........................................General. Including collective biography
50-266....................................History of drawing
390-670..................................Study and teaching
673-677..................................Competitions
703-725..................................General works
730-758..................................Technique
760-825..................................Special subjects
845-915..................................Graphic art materials
930........................................Conservation and restoration of drawings
950-(996)................................Illustration
997-1003................................Commercial art. Advertising art
1280-1284..............................Printed ephemera. Imagerie populaire
1300-1766..............................Pictorial humor, caricature, etc.
1800-1850..............................Posters
1860-1896..............................Greeting cards, postcards, invitations, book jackets, etc.
1920-1940..............................Copying, enlarging, and reduction of drawings

ND - Painting 

25-(48)....................................General
49-813....................................History
1115-1120..............................Study and teaching
1130-1156..............................General works
1288-1460..............................Special subjects
1290-1293....................................Human figure
1300-1337....................................Portraits
1340-1367....................................Landscape painting
1370-1375....................................Marine painting
1380-1383....................................Animals. Birds
1385-1388....................................Sports. Hunting, fishing, etc.
1390-1393....................................Still life
1400-1403....................................Flowers. Fruit. Trees
1410-1460....................................Other subjects
1470-1625..............................Technique and materials
1630-1662..............................Examination and conservation of paintings
1700-2495..............................Watercolor painting
2550-2733..............................Mural painting
2889-3416..............................Illuminating of manuscripts and books

NE - Print Media 

1-978......................................Printmaking and engraving
1-90..............................................General
218-(330)......................................Engraved portraits. Self-portraits
380................................................Conservation and restoration of prints
390-395........................................Collected works
400-773........................................History of printmaking
830-898........................................General works
951-962........................................Special subjects
965-965.3......................................Tradesmen's cards
970-973........................................Study and teaching
975-975.4......................................Competitions
977-978........................................Equipment
1000-1352..............................Wood engraving
1000-1027....................................General
1030-1196.3..................................History
1220-1233....................................General works
1310-1326.5..................................Japanese prints
1330-1336....................................Linoleum block prints
1340..............................................Fish prints
1344-1345....................................Potato prints
1350-1352....................................Other materials used in relief printing
1400-1879..............................Metal engraving
1400-1422....................................General
1620-1630....................................General works
1634-1749....................................History
1750-1775....................................Copper engraving
1850-1879....................................Color prints
1940-2232.5............................Etching and aquatint
1940-1975....................................General
1980-2055.5..................................History
2120-2140....................................General works
2141-2149....................................Special subjects
2220-2225....................................Dry point
2236-2240.6............................Serigraphy
2242-2246..............................Monotype (Printmaking)
2250-2570..............................Lithography
2685-2685.8............................Lumiprints
2690........................................Engraving on glass
2800-2880..............................Printing of engravings
3000-3002..............................Copying art. Copying machine art

NK - Decorative arts 

1-570......................................General
600-806..................................History
1135-1149.5............................Arts and crafts movement
1160-1590..............................Decoration and ornament. Design
1160-1174....................................General
1175-(1498)..................................History
1505-1535....................................General works
1548-1590....................................Special subjects for design
1648-1678..............................Religious art
1700-2195..............................Interior decoration. House decoration
1700-2138....................................General. History, etc. Including special rooms
2140-2180....................................Decorative painting
2190-2192....................................Church decoration
2200-2750..............................Furniture
2775-2898..............................Rugs and carpets
2975-3049..............................Tapestries
3175-3296.3............................Upholstery. Drapery
3375-3496.3............................Wallpapers
3600-(9990)............................Other arts and art industries
3700-4695....................................Ceramics
4700-4890....................................Costume
5100-5440....................................Glass
5500-6060....................................Glyptic arts
6400-8459....................................Metalwork
8800-9505.5..................................Textiles
9600-9955....................................Woodwork

NX - Arts in General 

1-820................................Arts in general
1-260......................................General
280-410..................................Study and teaching. Research
411-415..................................Competitions
420-430..................................Exhibitions
440-632..................................History of the arts
650-694..................................Special subjects, characters, persons, religious arts, etc.
700-750..................................Patronage of the arts
760-770..................................Administration of the arts
775-777..................................Voluntarism in the arts
798-820..................................Arts centers and facilities

References

Further reading 
 Full schedule of all LCC Classifications
 List of all LCC Classification Outlines

N